Juan Muñoz (8 February 1912 – 2 January 1977) was a Chilean footballer. He played in one match for the Chile national football team in 1941. He was also part of Chile's squad for the 1941 South American Championship.

References

External links
 

1912 births
1977 deaths
Chilean footballers
Chile international footballers
Place of birth missing
Association football forwards
Badminton F.C. footballers